Marva J. Dawn (August 20, 1948April 18, 2021) was an American Christian theologian, author, musician and educator, associated with the parachurch organization Christians Equipped for Ministry in  Vancouver, Washington. She also served as Teaching Fellow in Spiritual Theology at Regent College in Vancouver, British Columbia. Dawn was generally perceived as a Lutheran evangelical. She often wrote in a paleo-orthodox style, stressing the importance of Christian tradition and the wisdom of the Church through the centuries.

Biography 
Born in Napoleon, Ohio as Marva Gersmehl, she later took the surname Dawn as a pseudonym. After completing a B.A. (1970) from Concordia Teachers College, she completed a M.A. (1972) in English from the University of Idaho, an M.Div. (1978) in New Testament from Western Evangelical Seminary, and a Th.M. (1983) in Old Testament from Pacific Lutheran Theological Seminary. She then completed an M.A. (1986) and Ph.D. (1992) in Christian Ethics and the Scriptures from the University of Notre Dame. She has taught for clergy and worship conferences and at seminaries in North America and internationally.

She was married to Myron Sandberg, an elementary school teacher, in 1989.

She died in Vancouver, Washington on April 18, 2021.

Works 
Her 1995 book, Reaching Out Without Dumbing Down: A Theology of Worship for the Turn-of-the-Century Culture, which urged a second look at so-called "contemporary Christian worship", caused a stir in evangelical circles, being the first scholarly work from within the evangelical community to seriously question "seeker sensitive" style worship. Dawn claimed that much contemporary worship, which seeks primarily to evangelize through entertainment, is not really Christian worship at all. Rather than focus on bringing people into the church through worship, Dawn argued that worship should instead focus upon the glory and grace of the triune God, not ignoring the artistic treasures and traditions of the Church through the ages. The book remains her most widely read and most talked about work. Dawn continued this exploration in her 1999 book, A Royal "Waste" of Time: The Splendor of Worshiping God and Being Church for the World.

In her more recent work, Dawn has drawn on Albert Borgmann's notion of the device paradigm to develop a critique of the church in its capitulation to commodification where worship, for example, becomes a device to attract and please.

List of works 
 Talking the Walk: Letting Christian Language Live Again (2018). Eugene, OR: Wipf & Stock. 
The Sense of the Call: A Sabbath way of life for those who serve God, the church, and the world (2006). Grand Rapids, MI: Eerdmans. 
 How Shall We Worship?: Biblical Guidelines for the Worship Wars (2015). Eugene, OR: Wipf & Stock. 
In the Beginning, GOD: Creation, Culture, and the Spiritual Life (2009). Downers Grove, IL: InterVarsity Press. 
 Keeping the Sabbath Wholly: Ceasing, Resting, Embracing, Feasting
My Soul Waits: Solace for the Lonely in the Psalms (2007). Downers Grove, IL: InterVarsity Press. 
Unfettered Hope: A Call to Faithful Living in an Affluent Society (2003). Louisville: Westminster John Knox Press. 
 Powers, Weakness, and the Tabernacling of God (2001). Grand Rapids, MI: Eerdmans.  (2002 Christianity Today Book Award in the category of The Church/Pastoral Leadership)
Morning by Morning: Daily Meditations from the Writings of Marva J. Dawn (2001). Grand Rapids, MI: Eerdmans. 
 Truly the Community: Romans 12 and How to Be the Church (1997; formerly titled The Hilarity of Community). Grand Rapids, MI: Eerdmans. 
 The Unnecessary Pastor: Rediscovering the Call (2000). With Eugene H. Peterson. Grand Rapids, MI: Eerdmans. 
 A Royal Waste of Time: The Splendor of Worshiping God and Being Church for the World (1999). Grand Rapids, MI: Eerdmans. 
I'm Lonely, LORD - How Long?: Meditations on the Psalms (1998). Grand Rapids, MI: Eerdmans. 
Is It a Lost Cause?: Having the Heart of God for the Church's Children (1997). Grand Rapids, MI: Eerdmans. 
Reaching Out Without Dumbing Down: A Theology of Worship for This Urgent Time (1995). Grand Rapids, MI: Eerdmans. 
Joy in our Weakness A Gift of Hope from the Book of Revelation (1994). St. Louis, MO: Concordia Publishing House. 
Sexual Character: Beyond Technique to Intimacy (1993). Grand Rapids, MI: Eerdmans. 
To Walk and Not Faint (1980). New York: Christian Herald Books.

References

External links
 

1948 births
2021 deaths
American evangelicals
American Lutheran theologians
University of Notre Dame alumni
People from Napoleon, Ohio
Writers from Vancouver, Washington